Mjøsund Bridge is a cantilever bridge in Ibestad and Salangen municipalities in Troms og Finnmark county, Norway.  It is part of the Norwegian County Road 848 that crosses the Mjøsundet strait between the mainland of Norway and the island of Andørja.  The bridge and the nearby Ibestad Tunnel connect the two main islands of Ibestad together with the mainland.

The bridge lies just north of where the Salangen fjord and Astafjorden meet.

References

External links
Norske bruer og viadukter

Road bridges in Troms og Finnmark
Bridges completed in 1994
1994 establishments in Norway
Salangen
Ibestad
Roads within the Arctic Circle